Zabaykalsky District is an administrative and municipal district (raion), one of the thirty-one in Zabaykalsky Krai, Russia. It is located in the southeast of the krai, and borders with Borzinsky District in the north, Krasnokamensky District in the east, District in the south, and with District in the west. Its administrative center is the urban locality (an urban-type settlement) of Zabaykalsk. Population:  20,343 (2002 Census);  The population of Zabaykalsk accounts for 57.5% of the district's total population.

History
The district was established on January 2, 1967.

References

Notes

Sources



Districts of Zabaykalsky Krai
States and territories established in 1967